William Penn (1644–1718) was the English founder of Pennsylvania

William Penn may also refer to:

People 
 William Penn (Royal Navy officer) (1621–1670), English admiral under Cromwell and Charles II and the father of William Penn
 William Penn Jr. (1681–1720), eldest surviving son of William Penn, founder of Pennsylvania
 William Penn (athlete) (1883–1943), American tug-of-war competitor
 William Evander Penn (1832–1895), Texas Baptist evangelist and minister
 William S. Penn (born 1949), mixed-race Nez Perce author and English professor at Michigan State University
 William F. Penn (1871–1934), black physician in Atlanta, Georgia
 William Penn (pen name), pen name used by activist Jeremiah Evarts (1781–1831) in his essays against Indian removal
 William Penn (cricketer) (1849–1921), Kent county cricketer

Schools and societies 
 William Penn University, private liberal arts university in Iowa
 William Penn Middle School, part of the Pennsbury School District in Bucks County, Pennsylvania
 William Penn High School (Delaware) in New Castle, Delaware
 William Penn High School (North Carolina) in High Point, North Carolina
 William Penn High School (Philadelphia) in Philadelphia, Pennsylvania

Other
 William Penn (cigar brand), type of machine-made cigars manufactured by General Cigar Company
 USS Tecumseh (SSBN-628), submarine that was going to be named the USS William Penn
 a train operated by Amtrak as part of the Clocker service
 William Penn (Calder), an 1894 bronze statue by Alexander Milne Calder
 William Penn, Texas, an unincorporated community in Washington County, Texas

Penn, William